Hongkongers in Britain (HKB) is a Hongkonger expatriate association based in the United Kingdom that was established to unite the people of Hong Kong in the UK, and build an alliance with the international Hongkongers community. It was founded by a group of pro-democracy Hongkongers and activists including former British consulate officer Simon Cheng, Julian Chan etc.. Hongkongers in Britain is aim to offer a platform for HongKongers to support each other, enabling them to rebuild their lives in the UK. Hongkongers in Britain is a registered organisation in the UK (company number 12726075).

The purpose of Hongkongers in Britain is to unite Hongkongers in the UK, defend the rights and interests of all Hongkongers including British Nationals (Overseas) citizens, Hong Kong SAR passport holders and help the disadvantaged in emergencies.

Goals and services

Social connections 
Organise events to bring solidarity to Hongkongers in Britain. Provide opportunities for Hongkongers to gain connections and nurture a community spirit.

Business development 
Provide platform and business advice to Hongkongers in Britain. Liaison with existing trade associations and enhance Business connections between HK businesses in the UK . Providing advice and consultancy on business plans and on setting up businesses.

Public affairs 
Conducting limited levels of advocacy, partaking in civil affairs regarding both Hong Kong and Britain. Organise community efforts in engaging with UK grassroots, communicate the spirit of Hong Kong within UK society.

Cultural development 
Production and subsidying of projects by Hong Kong artists. Establish and promote culture of Hong Kong and reinforce the community spirit of HongKongers through the medium of culture.

Life in the UK 
Providing assistance for HongKongers to assimilate effectively into the British society, including immigration advice, career, education, and legal advice.

Activities

NHS donation 
On 26 March 2020, The Umbrella Union, the predecessor of the Association, raised over £47,000 in a week in the name of Hong Kong people to support NHS frontline healthcare workers. The chairman Simon Cheng hopes that in future, the UK will "Stand with Hong Kong" on important issues, and continue to support young people sacrificed for democracy, freedom and social movements in Hong Kong. The Association selected two hospitals seriously affected by the COVID-19 epidemic and, after deducting the administrative costs of the online fundraising platform, made a donation to St. Georgeʼs Hospital Charity on 7 May and to University College Hospital Charity on 12 May with £22,776.3 each in the name of "Hong Kong People". The Association has also prepared thank you cards to pass on the message of support from Hong Kong people to NHS staffs.

Poppy appeal 
On Remembrance Sunday 2020, Hongkongers in Britain presents the poppy wreath which had been delivered in front of the Cenotaph by British military officers. The poppy wreath represents Hongkongers stand with the UK and the world for peace and the spirits against the expanding totalitarianism.

BNO Policy Study 
In December 2020, Hongkongers in Britain issued a "Policy Study on BN(O) holders intending to come to the UK" which unveil the results of HongKongers in Britain (HKB)’s first research project: a policy study on Hong Kong’s BNO holders and their partners/ families who are considering to emigrate to the UK.

Letters to the UK Home Office 
Hongkongers in Britain has received reports of difficulties from some BN(O)s in proving their right to work during job interviews. In some cases, employers are uncertain about the stamps for the LOTR status and they request a written proof issued by the Home Office to confirm the right to work. On 2 December 2020, Hongkongers in Britain sent a letter to the Home Secretary to ask for further clarification and actions to avail the information to British employers, such as specifying the rights coming with the LOTR stamp or issuing an official letter to relieve the doubts of the employers and the general public.

As HKB has received reports of difficulties from some Hong Kong families in the UK. Some of these are grassroot families who work day and night to support their loved ones, yet their income is insufficient to afford paying the BN(O) visa and associated fees in one go. On 12 February 2021, HKB sent a letter to the Home Office, suggesting them to exercise discretion to relax regulations after review on a case-by-case basis, such as introducing an instalment system to relieve the pressure of some families.HKB recommends the Home Office to exercise discretion to review on a case by case basis (means tested) and show compassion to some families in genuine need, considering BN(O) visa fees and associated costs to be paid in instalments without using any further social resources.

Following the HKB’s letter to the UK Home Office , three shadow ministers also sent a letter to Ministry of Housing, Communities and Local Government said "unless the government reduces financial barriers, the BNO visa route will only be available 'for the rich,'" they warn. The letter was signed by Stephen Kinnock, shadow minister for Asia and the Pacific; Holly Lynch, shadow minister for immigration; and Steve Reed, shadow secretary of state for communities and local government.

On 4 March 2021, UK Home Office changes rules to allow BN(O) visa holders in difficult condition to access public funds on a case-by-case basis.

BNO welcome seminar 
On 30 January 2021, Hongkongers in Britain hosted a Welcome Seminar for prospective BNO Visa applicants.

Media exposure 
On 30 January 2021, Julian Chan, HKB's Head of Public Affairs, explained the background of the British National (Overseas) visa "lifeboat schemes", the estimated number of Hong Kong citizens immigrating to the UK, and analysed possible countermeasures by the Chinese and Hong Kong authorities on BBC TV News and TRT World News. In response to media interviews, Julian Chan said "in the face of the CCP’s countermeasures, we will work closely with the British central and local governments, other civic groups about Hong Kong and community organisations to safeguard the rights of British nationals (overseas) citizens and dependents."

Introduction of Census 2021 
On 7 March 2021, Hongkongers in Britain, Office for National Statistics’s community advisor, civil groups "Power to Hongkongers" and "Britains in Hong Kong" hosted a seminar introducing United Kingdom census 2021, encouraged Hongkongers living in the UK to identified themselves as "Hongkonger" in the census 2021.

See also 

 British nationality law and Hong Kong
 British Chinese
 British National (Overseas)
 East Asians in the United Kingdom
 Demographics of Hong Kong
 Transfer of sovereignty of Hong Kong
 Britons in Hong Kong
 Hong Kong people in the United Kingdom

References

External links 
 

Organisations based in the United Kingdom
Organizations established in 2020
Diaspora organizations
Hong Kong expatriates